Pieve di Coriano is a frazione of Borgo Mantovano in the Province of Mantua in the Italian region Lombardy, located about  southeast of Milan and about  southeast of Mantua.

References

Cities and towns in Lombardy
Borgo Mantovano